Muhammad Mizanuddin is a Bangladeshi academic. He served as the 22nd Vice-chancellor of Rajshahi University since March 20, 2013.

Education and career
Professor Mizanuddin passed matriculation exam in 1969 and intermediate exam in 1972. He completed his bachelor's and master's from University of Rajshahi in 1976 and 1978 respectively. He earned another master's from University of Alberta in 1983. In 1993, he obtained his Ph.D. from Jawaharlal Nehru University, Delhi in 1993.

References

Living people
University of Rajshahi alumni
Academic staff of the University of Rajshahi
University of Alberta alumni
Jawaharlal Nehru University alumni
Vice-Chancellors of the University of Rajshahi
Year of birth missing (living people)